The Trompowsky Attack (or Trompowsky Opening, also known as the Opočenský Opening, the Ruth Opening, and the Zot) is a chess opening that begins with the moves:

1. d4 Nf6
2. Bg5

White prepares to exchange the bishop for Black's knight, inflicting doubled pawns upon Black in the process. This is not a lethal threat; Black can choose to fall in with White's plan.

The Trompowsky is a popular alternative to the more common lines after 1.d4 Nf6 beginning 2.c4 or 2.Nf3. By playing 2.Bg5, White sidesteps immense bodies of opening theory of various Indian Defences like the Queen's Indian, King's Indian, Nimzo-Indian, as well as the Grünfeld Defence.

The opening is named after the one-time Brazilian champion Octávio Trompowsky (1897–1984) who played it in the 1930s and 1940s. Chess master Karel Opočenský (1892–1975) also played it in the 1930s, and the opening is also known as the Opočenský Opening. Also, chess master William Allen Ruth developed the opening simultaneously in the 1930s, and it was well-known by locals in Pennsylvania as the Ruth Opening. The Trompowsky has also been called the Zot.

Julian Hodgson and Antoaneta Stefanova are among several grandmasters who often employ the Trompowsky. World Champion Magnus Carlsen has occasionally employed the Trompowsky, notably in the first game of the 2016 World Chess Championship against Sergey Karjakin.

Main lines
Black has a number of ways to meet the Trompowsky, some of which avoid doubled pawns, while others allow them. The most common Black responses are discussed here.
 2...Ne4 is the most common reply. Black violates an opening principle ("Don't move the same piece twice in the opening"), but attacks White's bishop, forcing it to either move again or be defended.
 Usually, White retreats with 3.Bf4 or 3.Bh4. In this case, Black will try to maintain the knight on e4, or at least gain a concession before retreating it. (For instance, if White chases the knight away with f3, the pawn takes away the best  square from White's own knight.)
 2...e6 also avoids doubled pawns since the queen can recapture if White plays Bxf6. The move 2...e6 also opens a diagonal for the black  to develop. On the other hand, the knight is now pinned, and this can be annoying.
 2...d5 makes a grab for the centre, allowing White to inflict doubled pawns. If White does so, Black will try to show that the pair of bishops is valuable, and that White has wasted time by moving a bishop twice in order to trade it off. Alternatively, White can transpose into the Richter–Veresov Attack with 3.Nc3 or the Tartakower Variation of the  Torre Attack with 3.Nf3.
 2...c5 also makes a grab for the centre, planning to trade off the c-pawn for White's d-pawn. Again, White can inflict doubled pawns, and again Black will try to make use of the bishop pair.
 2...g6 enables Black to fianchetto the dark-squared bishop.  If White immediately captures the knight (3.Bxf6), Black must recapture away from the centre with 3...exf6.
 2...c6 is an offbeat line in which Black intends ...Qb6, forcing White to defend or sacrifice the b-pawn. White can play the thematic 3.Bxf6 or 3.Nf3, but must avoid 3.e3 Qa5+, when White resigned (in light of 4...Qxg5) in Djordjević–Kovačević, Bela Crkva 1984—"the shortest ever loss by a master" (Graham Burgess, The Quickest Chess Victories of All Time, p. 33).

1.d4 d5 2.Bg5
White can also play 2.Bg5 after 1.d4 d5. This is known as the Pseudo-Trompowsky, Hodgson Attack, Levitsky Attack, Queen's Bishop Attack, and Bishop Attack, and is covered in ECO code D00. Play transposes to the Trompowsky if Black plays 2...Nf6.

See also
 Torre Attack
 Hodgson Attack
 List of chess openings
 List of chess openings named after people

Notes

References

Further reading

Gallagher, Joe (1998). The Trompovsky. Chess Press. 

 Edward Winter's "The Trompowsky Opening" (Chess Notes Feature Article)

Chess openings